Proeulia macrobasana is a species of moth of the family Tortricidae. It is found in Chile in the Araucanía and Bío Bío regions.

The wingspan is 18 mm. The proximal half of the forewings is cream suffused with ferruginous in the basal and dorsal parts of the wing. The hindwings are cream in the costal area and brownish grey in the remaining parts.

Etymology
The species name refers to the large basal broadening of the uncus and is derived from Greek makros (meaning large).

References

Moths described in 2010
Proeulia
Moths of South America
Taxa named by Józef Razowski
Endemic fauna of Chile